Business Under Distress is a 1931 Czech comedy film directed by Karel Lamač and Martin Frič. A German version of the movie Wehe, wenn er losgelassen was released in 1932.

Cast
 Vlasta Burian as Popelec Hadimrška
 Meda Valentová as Mici Angora
 Otto Rubík as Jiří Zlatník
 Marie Grossová as Asta Vieland
 Čeněk Šlégl as Consul Peter Vieland
 Jaroslav Marvan as Bruckmann, general director
 Jindřich Plachta as Butler Puntík
 Eman Fiala as Vychodil
 Světla Svozilová as Cousin Aloysia Zlatnik
 Josef Rovenský as The Pickpocket
 Jan Richter as Police Commissar
 Jan W. Speerger as Salesman / angel in the dream / councillor

See also
 Wehe, wenn er losgelassen (1932)
 The Dangerous Game (1933)
 Josef the Chaste (1953)

References

External links
 

1931 films
1931 comedy films
Czech black-and-white films
Czechoslovak black-and-white films
Films directed by Martin Frič
Films directed by Karel Lamač
Czechoslovak multilingual films
Czech films based on plays
Czechoslovak comedy films
1931 multilingual films
1930s Czech films